Joel Taylor is a Grand Prix motorcycle racer from Australia. He earned a Moto125 wildcard into the 2010 Iveco Australian Motorcycle Grand Prix at Phillip Island. He spent much of 2010 racing in Spain. He began his road racing career as a 13-year-old in 2007, and moved to the 125cc class in 2009.

Career statistics

By season

Races by year

References

External links
 Profile on motogp.com

Australian motorcycle racers
Living people
1994 births